Slick Shoes is an American punk rock band from Antelope Valley, California, United States. The band formed in 1994 and made their first release as a self-titled EP in 1996. In 2022, Loudwire magazine named the "Wake Up Screaming" album one of the 50 greatest pop-punk albums of all time.

Slick Shoes released six full-length CDs, four of them on Seattle-based Tooth & Nail Records. They also released an EP, a split with Autopilot Off and a greatest hits CD entitled The Biggest & The Best, featuring three previously unreleased songs. 

The band had gone through numerous line-up changes over the years, but singer Ryan Kepke and Joe Nixon (drums) performed on every release, while Jeremiah Brown (bass) played on all except their final album, Far From Nowhere (2003), released by SideOneDummy Records instead of the Tooth & Nail.

The third album, Wake Up Screaming (2000) got production from Bill Stevenson of Black Flag fame.  

The band's success rode the back of the mid-to-late '90s Christian punk popularity wave that spurred churched teens around the nation to embrace the genre and even start rock clubs, such as the 9th Hour in Richmond and The New Union in Minneapolis. They toured alongside both secular and Christian acts (most notably bands such as Face to Face and MxPx, respectively). In 2002, they toured with Mighty Mighty Bosstones; in 2003, they played the Vans Warped Tour and were featured in Warped Tour DVD in 2004. The Jonas Brothers, when teens, were fans and traveled to their shows.

2004-2008 
Since touring in 2003 and early 2004 in support of Far From Nowhere, Slick Shoes was very inactive (even their website was taken down), and on October 7, 2006 the band issued a statement through their MySpace page saying that they had begun a side project called Sigmund, and that Slick Shoes was on an "indefinite hiatus".  Then, 15 months later on January 3, 2008, the band announced through MySpace that they had reunited:

"Slick Shoes is back together with original members Ryan Kepke, Jackson Mould, Joe Nixon, and Jeremiah Brown. We also added guitarist Jordan Mould . Although we will not be touring extensively we will be playing shows and hope to record a new record in the near future. Don't forget to tell your friends."

Post-2017 
Their first show back together took place at Schooner's in Lancaster, CA in December, 2007, with their last show at the Key Club in Hollywood, CA on April 10, 2008.

The band has been inactive since early 2008, but in October 2011, the band created an official Facebook page. On December 11, 2011, the band announced a comeback show on March 17, 2012 at Chain Reaction in Anaheim, California.

On February 17–18, Slick Shoes did a two night stand in Dallas Texas at the legendary Tree's Venue.

As of early 2017 Slick Shoes is back in action with original "Rusty" line up (as well as Jonah from the Far from Nowhere Era). They are playing select shows through the year and are currently writing and rehearsing new material.

On August 18, 2018, Slick Shoes headlined a show at the House of Blues Anaheim Parish Room. They announced that the show was being recorded for their first live album.

October 24, 2019, Slick Shoes Announced they were rejoining Tooth and Nail Records with "Broadcasting Live" and a new album, "Rotation & Frequency", released in September 2020.

Style and influences
Slick Shoes has been described as punk rock, pop punk, and skate punk.Blink-182 and Green Day. The band's influences include Germs, Descendents, Lagwagon, Angelic Upstarts and Circle Jerks.

The name comes from the 1985 movie The Goonies. In the film, Richard "Data" Wang (played by Jonathan Ke Huy Quan says "I got a great idea you guys: Slick shoes." They reply, in unison, "Slick shoes? Are you crazy?" The clip is the intro to the first song on the first Slick Shoes album.

Discography
Rusty (1997)
Burn Out (1998)
Wake Up Screaming (2000)
Slick Shoes (2002)
Far from Nowhere (2003)
Broadcasting Live (2019)
Rotation & Frequency (2020)

References

External links
Slick Shoes MySpace Page
Slick Shoes Facebook Page

Archived links
Slick Shoes Purevolume Page
Slick Shoes at SideOneDummy.com
Interview
Interview at Decapolis.com

Christian punk groups
Christian rock groups from California
Musical groups established in 1994
Pop punk groups from California
Punk rock groups from California
Tooth & Nail Records artists